Sabrina is a 2018 Indonesian horror film directed by Rocky Soraya and written by Riheam Junianti and Fajar Umbara.

Plot 

Vanya, who recently lost her mother, finds herself unable to adapt to residing with uncle Aiden Kev and aunt Maira. Aiden acquired the rights to a trending doll named Sabrina, and created a unique version just for her. Maira gifts it to Vanya, who is having her birthday. Vanya becomes happier, but does not heal from grief. While at school, Vanya is given a Charlie Charlie game by classmate Ditho, looking to communicate with her deceased mom. She forgets to say goodbye to Charlie and pray, which is important so that the spiritual door is closed and the invited spirits can go back to heaven correctly; Sabrina is possessed. Vanya begins to become more and more interested in the paranormal. In order to stop Vanya's interest in the paranormal, Aiden comes to a decision to take her on a holiday to spend quality time together with her and Maira. This attempt still fails. One night amid vacation, Aiden and Maira start to see Vanya's mother, Andini. After the vacation, the couple travel to Bandung, begging demonologists Laras and Bagas to return Andini's spirit to heaven.

Vanya is brought to her nanny as they perform a ritual. Andini possesses Vanya and stabs the nanny. They then carry out an exorcism on Vanya, enabling a sequence of possessions. It concludes with the reveal that the spirit isn't always Andini, but Baghiah, a demon that seeks a human host to perform ritual killings, using loved ones as bait. Everyone escapes, and Laras locks the door, but Baghiah quickly escapes the house. With a new method, they carry out a ritual on the residence. Baghiah reminds Laras of a ritual she and Bagas performed years ago on Baghiah, who traumatized Aiden. Aiden broke the rule of not entering the ritual room until the ritual is completed. It is revealed that Aiden's father bequeathed 40% of Kev Toys to Aiden, with 60% to his brother. Fueled by jealousy, Aiden visited a shaman and asked the shaman to kill his brother. The brother is killed, however, the price of Aiden's jealously was great; Andini life is lost. As Baghiah vanishes and Aiden's crimes revealed, Aiden is arrested.

Upon Andini's spirit's request, Vanya christens Maira her mom. Meanwhile, Laras and Bagas receive a name from someone asking them to solve a case, one worse than the latest.

Cast 
 Luna Maya as Maira, Aiden's wife and Vanya's aunt
 Christian Sugiono as Aiden, Maira's husband and Vanya's uncle
 Sara Wijayanto as Laras, Raynard's wife and the psychic who help Maira
 Jeremy Thomas as Raynard, Laras' husband and the psychic who help Maira
 Rizky Hanggono as Arka, Aiden's elder brother, Andini's husband, Vanya's deceased father
 Richelle Georgette Skornicki as Vanya, Arka and Andini's daughter, Aiden and Maira's niece
 Asri Handayani as Andini, Arka's wife and Vanya's deceased mother
 Demian Aditya as Dedi, Laras' deceased husband
 Sahil Shah as Baghiah, the demon who possessed Sabrina the doll
 Imelda as Bi Nur, Aiden's servant and Vanya's nanny
 Habibie Alatas as Dukun, the shaman who summons demon Baghiah
 Adlu Fahrezi as Ditho, Vanya's schoolmate
 Vidya Ully as Aiden and Arka's Mother, Vanya's deceased grandmother
 Felix William Smitts as Aiden and Arka's Father, Vanya's deceased grandfather
 Yasmine Mahya as Valerie, Vanya's schoolmate

References

External links 
 
 
 

2018 films
2018 horror films
Indonesian horror films
2010s Indonesian-language films